Murex is a genus of medium to large sized predatory tropical sea snails. 

Murex may also refer to:
 SS Murex (1892) early bulk-oil tanker ship named after the sea snail
 Murex (company) British iron industry plant firm
 Murex d'Or Lebanese art prize
 Murex (financial software) Platform for trading, hedging, funding, risk management or processing operations